Franck Mbarga (born 9 January 1992) is a Cameroonian professional footballer who plays as a midfielder for Al Sahel SC in Kuwait. He also holds German citizenship.

Career

Club career
He relocated to Bulgaria, signing a contract with Slavia Sofia in early 2015, where he remained until October of that year. On 28 January 2016, Mbarga became part of the 1461 Trabzon team. In July 2018, he moved to Lokomotiv Sofia. On 7 February 2020, Mbarge confirmed on his official Instagram profile, that he had signed for Al Sahel SC in Kuwait.

References

External links
 
 
 Franck Mbarga at KTFF

1992 births
Living people
Cameroonian footballers
Cameroonian expatriate footballers
PFC Slavia Sofia players
FC Lokomotiv 1929 Sofia players
CS Afumați players
TSG 1899 Hoffenheim II players
SV Waldhof Mannheim players
Anagennisi Giannitsa F.C. players
1461 Trabzon footballers
CSM Ceahlăul Piatra Neamț players
Regionalliga players
Football League (Greece) players
TFF First League players
First Professional Football League (Bulgaria) players
Second Professional Football League (Bulgaria) players
Association football midfielders
Expatriate footballers in Spain
Expatriate footballers in Germany
Expatriate footballers in Greece
Expatriate footballers in Bulgaria
Expatriate footballers in Turkey
Expatriate footballers in Cyprus
Expatriate footballers in Romania
Expatriate footballers in Kuwait
Cameroonian expatriate sportspeople in Spain
Cameroonian expatriate sportspeople in Germany
Cameroonian expatriate sportspeople in Greece
Cameroonian expatriate sportspeople in Bulgaria
Cameroonian expatriate sportspeople in Turkey
Cameroonian expatriate sportspeople in Romania
Al-Sahel SC (Kuwait) players
Cameroonian expatriate sportspeople in Cyprus
Cameroonian expatriate sportspeople in Kuwait
Kuwait Premier League players